Frank Ertel Carlyle (April 7, 1897 – October 2, 1960) was a United States representative of the Democratic Party from the state of North Carolina. He graduated from the University of North Carolina at Chapel Hill.

Career
After serving in the US Navy during World War I he practiced law in Lumberton, North Carolina. After serving as the solicitor of the 9th judicial district of North Carolina he was elected to the 81st United States Congress. Carlyle would serve two more terms before losing re-election in 1956. He was a signatory to the 1956 Southern Manifesto that opposed the desegregation of public schools ordered by the Supreme Court in Brown v. Board of Education.

External links

1897 births
1960 deaths
Democratic Party members of the United States House of Representatives from North Carolina
University of North Carolina alumni
20th-century American politicians